The following elections occurred in the year 1943.

Africa
 1943 Liberian general election
 1943 South African general election

Asia
 1943–1944 Iranian legislative election
 1943 Philippine legislative election

Europe
 1943 Danish Folketing election
 1943 Danish Landsting election
 1943 Irish general election

United Kingdom
 1943 Acton by-election
 1943 Belfast West by-election
 1943 Bristol Central by-election
 1943 Buckingham by-election
 1943 Chippenham by-election
 1943 Consett by-election
 1943 Darwen by-election
 1943 King's Lynn by-election
 1943 Midlothian and Peebles Northern by-election
 1943 St Albans by-election
 1943 University of Wales by-election

North America

Canada
 1943 Edmonton municipal election
 1943 Ontario Liberal Party leadership election
 1943 Ontario general election
 1943 Prince Edward Island general election
 1943 Toronto municipal election

United States
 1943 New York state election

Oceania
 1943 New Zealand general election

Australia
 1943 Australian federal election
 1943 Western Australian state election

See also
 :Category:1943 elections

1943
Elections